Half Alive is a compilation album by Suicide, originally released on cassette only on September 9, 1981 by ROIR. It is composed of live recordings from 1978 and home and studio demos recorded between 1974-1979.

Track listing

Personnel
Adapted from the Half Alive liner notes.

Suicide
 Martin Rev – keyboards, drum programming
 Alan Vega – vocals

Production and additional personnel
 John Hanti – executive production
 Stanley Moskowitz – mastering
 Jim Sclavunos – design
 Wayne Vlcan – mixing

Release history

References

External links 
 

1981 compilation albums
Suicide (band) albums
ROIR compilation albums